Reigi-Nõmme (Nõmme until 2017) is a village in Hiiumaa Parish, Hiiu County in northwestern Estonia. As of 2011, the population in Reigi-Nõmme is 2. This is the same as it was in the year 2000.

References

Villages in Hiiu County